The 2002 FC Anzhi Makhachkala season was the 3rd season that the club played in the Russian Top Division, the highest tier of football in Russia, following their promotion from the National Football League in 1999. They finished the season in 15th, and were relegated back to the National Football League for the 2003 Season.

Squad

Left club during season

Transfers

In

Loans in

Out

Released

Competitions

Overview

Premier League

League table

Results by round

Results

Russian Cup

2002-03

Progress to Round of 16 in 2003 Season

Squad statistics

Appearances and goals

|-
|colspan="14"|Players who appeared for Anzhi Makhachkala but left during the season:

|}

Goal Scorers

Clean sheets

Disciplinary record

References

External links
Squad List

2002
Anzhi Makhachkala